Aarnio is a Finnish surname. Notable people with the surname include:

Eero Aarnio (born 1932), Finnish interior designer
Matti Aarnio (1901–1984), Finnish military officer
Reino Aarnio (1912–1988), American architect
Tero Aarnio (born 1984), Finnish motorcycle speedway rider

References

Finnish-language surnames